Ioannis "Giannis" Agravanis (Greek: Ιωάννης "Γιάννης" Αγραβάνης; born November 13, 1998) is a Greek professional basketball player for Karditsa of the Greek Basket League. At a height of 1.98 m (6 ft 6 in) tall, he plays at the small forward position.

Youth career
Agravanis played from a young age with the youth teams of Doukas, before he started his pro career.

Professional career
Agravanis began his pro career in the 2016–17 season, with the Greek 2nd Division club Doukas. On August 9, 2017, Agravanis moved to AEK Athens of the top-tier level Greek League. He signed a three-year contract with AEK, with the option to sign with the club for an additional two years. With AEK, he also won the Greek Cup title, in 2018.

On September 22, 2018, he was loaned from AEK to Peristeri, for the 2018–19 season. His loan was renewed for another season on August 13, 2019. On August 1, 2020, Agravanis was officially released from AEK Athens. 

Subsequently, Agravanis signed a three-year contract with Promitheas Patras, which then loaned him to the Greek club Charilaos Trikoupis, for the 2020–21 season. 

On July 25, 2021, Agravanis moved to Iraklis Thessaloniki. On February 2, 2022, he mutually parted ways with the club due to disciplinary reasons. In 11 games, he averaged 10.2 points and 5.1 rebounds, playing around 31 minutes per contest. On April 8 of the same year, Agravanis agreed to return to Promitheas for the rest of the season. In 18 league games, he averaged 5.2 points, 2.4 rebounds and 1.3 assists, playing around 16 minutes per contest.

On August 3, 2022, Agravanis signed with the newly promoted Karditsa.

National team career
As a member of the junior national teams of Greece, Agravanis played at the 2016 FIBA Europe Under-18 Championship, and at the 2017 FIBA Europe Under-20 Championship, where he won a gold medal.

Personal life
Agravanis' older brother, Dimitris, is also a professional basketball player, and he currently plays with Promitheas Patras.

Career statistics

Domestic Leagues

Regular season

|-
| 2017–18
| style="text-align:left;"| A.E.K.
| align=center | GBL
| 3 || 2.4 || .000 || .000 || - || 0 || .3 || .3 || 0 || 0
|-
| 2018–19
| style="text-align:left;"| Peristeri
| align=center | GBL
| 25 || 12.4 || .368 || .324 || .722 || 2.3 || .6 || .6 || 0 || 2.6
|}

Awards and accomplishments

Pro career
FIBA Champions League winner: (2018)
Greek Cup Winner: (2018)

Greek junior national team
2017 FIBA Europe Under-20 Championship:

References

External links
FIBA Profile (archive)
Eurobasket.com Profile
Greek Basket League Profile 
Greek Basket League Profile 

1998 births
Living people
AEK B.C. players
Charilaos Trikoupis B.C. players
Doukas B.C. players
Greek Basket League players
Greek men's basketball players
Iraklis Thessaloniki B.C. players
Peristeri B.C. players
Promitheas Patras B.C. players
Small forwards
Basketball players from Athens